Aechmea bocainensis is a species of plant in the genus Aechmea. This species is endemic to Brazil, found in the States of Rio de Janeiro and São Paulo.

References

bocainensis
Flora of Brazil
Plants described in 1986